Gardenia tubifera, also called golden gardenia, is a species of flowering small tree in the genus Gardenia, native to Asia. It is a small tree, growing to a height of 2–4 m (6–12 ft) high with a spread of 1–2 m (3–6 ft). It prefers tropical conditions and will not tolerate temperatures below freezing.

Varieties 
 Gardenia tubifera var. kula

References

External links 
 
 
 

tubifera